Lorrain may refer to:

 Claude Lorrain (1600–82), a 17th-century French artist of the baroque style
 Lorrain language, a Romance dialect spoken in Lorraine region in France and Gaume region in Belgium

See also 
 Lorain (disambiguation)
 Loraine (disambiguation)
 Lorraine (disambiguation)